Vadim Kurach (28 March 1970 – 21 January 2017) was a Soviet hurdler. He competed in the men's 110 metres hurdles at the 1992 Summer Olympics, representing the Unified Team.

References

1970 births
2017 deaths
Athletes (track and field) at the 1992 Summer Olympics
Soviet male hurdlers
Olympic athletes of the Unified Team
Place of birth missing